Dundee High School may refer to:

High School of Dundee, Dundee, Scotland 
Dundee High School (Michigan), Dundee, Michigan, USA
Dundee-Crown High School, Carpentersville, Illinois, USA
Dundee Junior - Senior High School, Dundee, New York, USA